Bellator, warrior in Latin, may refer to:

 Bellator MMA, a mixed martial arts promotion based in the United States
 Bishop Bellator of Sufetula (5th century)

Taxonomy
 Bellator (fish), a fish genus in the family Triglidae (sea robins)
 Bellator egretta, the streamer searobin
 Bellator militaris, the horned searobin
 Anopheles bellator, a mosquito species in the genus Anopheles
 Blennidus bellator, a species of ground beetle in the subfamily Pterostichinae
 , an insect species in the genus Clidicus
 Eleutherodactylus bellator, a frog species in the genus Eleutherodactylus
 Etheostoma bellator, the warrior darter, a freshwater fish species in the genus Etheostoma
 , a frog species in the genus Pristimantis

See also
 List of Roman cognomina